Zangui may refer to:
 Zangui, Nehbandan